The Barauni–Samastipur section is a railway line connecting Barauni to Samastipur  in the Indian state of Bihar. The  line passes through the plains of North Bihar and the Gangetic Plain in Bihar.

Electrification

Former Railway Minister Lalu Prasad Yadav announced for the electrification of the Barauni–Samastipur–Muzaffarpur–Hajipur line and Muzaffarpur–Gorakhpur line (via Hajipur, Raxaul and Sitamarhi) in the Rail Budget 2008. The electrification began in 2011 and was completed in 2014.

The electrification work was completed in December 2014 itself. But the first passenger train to run with an electric locomotive was Maurya Express w.e.f. 23 November 2015.

Stations

Speed limit
The Barauni–Samastipur–Muzaffarpur–Hajipur line is not an A-Class line of Indian Railways. So maximum speed is restricted to 110 km/h.

Sidings and workshops
The following sidings and workshops exist on the line:
 100+ diesel locomotive yard capacity at Samastipur
 Freight terminal at Karpurigram railway station
 Workshop for wagon maintenance at Samastipur
 Barauni Thermal Power Station, Barauni
 Indian Oil Corporation, Barauni
 Major freight terminal at Garhara Yard

See also
 Muzaffarpur–Gorakhpur line (via Hajipur, Raxaul and Sitamarhi)
 Barauni–Gorakhpur, Raxaul and Jainagar lines
 Muzaffarpur–Hajipur section
 Samastipur–Muzaffarpur section
 
 
 East Central Railway zone

References

|

5 ft 6 in gauge railways in India
Railway lines in Bihar

Railway lines opened in 1886
Transport in Samastipur
Transport in Barauni